Jacob "Jake" Middleton (born January 2, 1996) is a Canadian professional ice hockey defenceman for the Minnesota Wild of the National Hockey League (NHL). He was originally drafted 210th overall (the last pick in the draft) by the Los Angeles Kings in the 2014 NHL Entry Draft.

Playing career
After being drafted by the Owen Sound Attack in the 2012 Ontario Hockey League Draft, Middleton played 14 games for the team before being traded to the Ottawa 67's on January 7, 2013. On January 8, 2016, in his fourth season with the 67's, Middleton was named captain of the team. After concluding that season, on April 8, 2016, Middleton signed an amateur try-out agreement with the Manchester Monarchs of the ECHL. He played seven games for the Monarchs before joining the American Hockey League (AHL) affiliate of the San Jose Sharks, the San Jose Barracuda, for the 2016–17 season.

On September 7, 2017, Middleton signed a three-year, entry-level contract with the San Jose Sharks. He subsequently played the 2017–18 season with their American Hockey League affiliate, the San Jose Barracuda.

While attending the Sharks' training camp prior to the 2018–19 season, on September 23, 2018, Middleton was reassigned to Barracuda. On January 5, 2019, Middleton was recalled from the Barracuda, and made his NHL debut that night against the Tampa Bay Lightning. He recorded his first point on April 4, 2019, in a 3–2 victory against the Edmonton Oilers. On October 5, 2019, he was placed on injured reserve.

In the  season, while remaining on the Sharks roster, Middleton scored his first NHL goal in a 6–3 win against the Ottawa Senators on November 24, 2021. He compiled career best marks of 3 goals and 9 points through 45 games. While in the midst of his first full NHL season he was traded by the Sharks, along with a 2022 fifth-round draft pick to the Minnesota Wild in exchange for Kaapo Kahkonen on March 21, 2022.

As a pending free agent, Middleton opted to remain with the Wild in signing a three-year, $7.35 million extension on July 6, 2022.

Personal
Jake formerly played alongside his brother, Keaton, for the AHL's San Jose Barracuda between 2018 and 2020. Keaton currently plays within the rival Colorado Avalanche organization.

Career statistics

Regular season and playoffs

International

Awards and honours

References

External links

1996 births
Living people
Canadian expatriate ice hockey players in the United States
Canadian ice hockey defencemen
Ice hockey people from Ontario
Los Angeles Kings draft picks
Manchester Monarchs (ECHL) players
Minnesota Wild players
Owen Sound Attack players
Ottawa 67's players
San Jose Barracuda players
San Jose Sharks players
Sportspeople from Stratford, Ontario